Mimagoniates is a genus of characid fish from rivers and streams in southeastern, southern and central-western Brazil, northeastern Argentina, and Paraguay. The individual species generally have relatively small ranges and two, M. lateralis and M. sylvicola, are considered threatened by Brazil's Ministry of the Environment.

Commonly known as croaking tetra or chirping tetra because they can produce sounds, some of these fish were historically included in Glandulocauda and together with Lophiobrycon they form the tribe Glandulocaudini. Mimagoniates have a supplementary breathing organ located above the gills which makes a faint chirping sound when these fish come to the surface to gulp air. It also plays a role in courtship as the male chases and hovers near the female while taking gulps of air and expelling it to make a rhythmic noise. Croaking behavior may have evolved from a behavior called "surface nipping", which occurs when the fish is searching for food. This gulping of air has no useful respiratory function.

Species
There are currently 7 recognized species in this genus:

 Mimagoniates barberi  Regan, 1907 
 Mimagoniates inequalis (C. H. Eigenmann, 1911) (Croaking tetra)
 Mimagoniates lateralis  (Nichols, 1913)
 Mimagoniates microlepis  (Steindachner, 1877) (Blue tetra) 
 Mimagoniates pulcher Menezes & S. H. Weitzman, 2009
 Mimagoniates rheocharis  Menezes & S. H. Weitzman, 1990 
 Mimagoniates sylvicola Menezes & S. H. Weitzman, 1990

References

Characidae
Taxa named by Charles Tate Regan